Merry F#%$in' Christmas is a 2004  comedy album released by actor and comedian Denis Leary. It runs for twenty minutes and includes unreleased sessions recorded for his 1997 album Lock 'n Load and two tracks previously released on that album ("Deaf Mute Cocktail Party" and "Insane Cowboy (In Africa)").

Since the holiday season of 2005, Comedy Central has periodically aired Denis Leary's Merry F#%$in' Christmas, an hour-long (with commercials) Christmas special featuring Leary and several celebrity guests, including Charlie Murphy, Carmen Electra, William Shatner, and the Barenaked Ladies.  The song "Merry F#%$in' Christmas" is the title theme of the special, set to a parody of Rankin/Bass' signature "Animagic" stop-motion animation; no other tracks from the album appear in the special (though the cast performs a new live version of the title theme).

Track listing
 Merry F#%$in' Christmas (Studio)
 Fat Guy On the Plane
 Deaf Mute Cocktail Party
 WWWW
 Jack Goes to School
 Insane Cowboy (In Africa)
 Coffin Rap
 The Theme From Jesus & The Gang
 Dogsledding
 Merry F#%$in' Christmas (Live)

Personnel
 Denis Leary – spoken vocals

References

Denis Leary albums
Comedy Central Records albums
2004 albums
2000s comedy albums